Yannick Ponsero (born 17 October 1986) is a French former competitive figure skater. He won two medals at the World Junior Championships (silver in 2005, bronze in 2006) and two medals on the ISU Junior Grand Prix series, including gold in France. On the senior level, he is the 2008 NHK Trophy bronze medalist, a two-time International Cup of Nice champion, and the 2009 French national champion.

Personal life
Ponsero was born on 17 October 1986 in Annecy, France. In addition to skating, he competed in skiing events until the age of 12. He studied physiotherapy.

Career
Ponsero began skating at age four after watching his sister Christina at the rink. He represented the SG Annecy club and was coached by Didier Lucine for many years.

In the 2001–02 season, Ponsero debuted on the Junior Grand Prix (JGP) series and competed at his first World Junior Championships, finishing 8th. In March 2005, he stepped onto the podium at the World Junior Championships in Kitchener, Ontario, Canada; ranked third in his qualifying group, first in the short program, and second in the free skate, he won the silver medal behind Nobunari Oda of Japan.

Making his senior Grand Prix (GP) debut, Ponsero placed fifth in October 2005 at Skate America. He was seventh at his second GP assignment, the 2005 NHK Trophy. In March 2006, he ranked second in his qualifying group, first in the short, and seventh in the free at the World Junior Championships in Ljubljana, Slovenia; he was awarded the bronze medal behind Japan's Takahiko Kozuka and Russia's Sergei Voronov.

Ponsero won the International Cup of Nice in 2007 and 2008. Competing in the 2008–09 Grand Prix series, he finished fourth at the 2008 Skate Canada International, having dropped from first after the short program. He won his only Grand Prix medal, a bronze, at the 2008 NHK Trophy and became an alternate for the Grand Prix Final. At the 2009 European Championships, Ponsero was 9th following the short program. He won the long program with a new personal best but missed out on a medal by 0.06 of a point.

At the 2010 European Championships, Ponsero was third following the short program and seventh in the long program, finishing sixth overall. He was not selected for either the 2010 Winter Olympics in Vancouver or the 2010 World Championships in Turin. In January 2011, he announced that he had decided to take time off from skating in order to focus on his studies.

Programs

Competitive highlights
GP: Grand Prix; JGP: Junior Grand Prix

References

External links

 
 Official website of Yannick Ponsero

1986 births
Living people
French male single skaters
Sportspeople from Annecy
World Junior Figure Skating Championships medalists
Competitors at the 2011 Winter Universiade
Competitors at the 2005 Winter Universiade